The Texas Juvenile Justice Department (TJJD) is a state agency in Texas, headquartered in the Braker H Complex in Austin.

It was created on December 1, 2011, replacing the Texas Youth Commission and the Texas Juvenile Probation Commission.

History

The implemented changes occurred after the 82nd Texas Legislature abolished the Texas Youth Commission due to the scandals surrounding this agency that was responsible from 1957 to 2011. The Texas Juvenile Justice Department was established by the legislature to manage and oversee the agencies that were abolished. There is a board that includes 11 members that are responsible for overseeing juvenile justice services from entry to the discharge of the youth; the board was selected by the Governor of Texas with Texas Senate approval.

Purpose
Texas Juvenile Justice Department focuses on the treatment and rehabilitation of the detained youth. TJJD seeks to provide a safe environment to juvenile offenders. The purpose of this entity is to assist juveniles to obtain rehabilitative services in order to successfully become good citizens. TJJD also strives to educate youth about ethics, work and guide troubled youth to becoming productive individuals, in addition to disciplining all youth entering registered TJJD facilities.

Juvenile offenders are court ordered to reside in Texas Juvenile Justice Department facilities. The detained individuals must be at least 10 years of age and no older than the age of 17. Most juvenile records are sealed as this will allow the youth to gain a second opportunity, but there are exceptions to sealing records as those individuals that commit serious crimes may be required to complete their sentence in an adult system, therefore unable to get their records sealed.

As well as being focused on the treatment and rehabilitation of the detained youth TJJD has a vision to provide safety to the citizens of Texas through partnerships with communities by being able to deliver the continued programs that help the betterment of their lives. Teaching them the value of not only their lives but also the importance of the community by showing them accountability of their actions and planning for a more successful future in the long run.

Facilities

Texas Juvenile Justice Department operates and maintains institutions and halfway houses statewide. Several of the juvenile detention centers are public and privately operated facilities. Texas Juvenile Justice Department maintains records and registry of the registered facilities in operation. Detained young offenders can only be placed in detention centers that are registered by the Texas Juvenile Justice Department, under the Texas Family Code.

Registered facilities house, educate, train and rehabilitate young offenders, the treatment and programs are based on the needs of the individual within the facility. The Texas Juvenile Justice Department includes high, medium and low security facilities. A high security facility is fenced and the majority of juvenile offenders that are placed in a high security facility tend to complete their sentence in a correctional institution. The medium to low facilities are not fenced and consist of houses that the Texas Juvenile Justice Department operates or contracts with outside organizations to provide low to medium treatment for the juvenile offender.

According to the Texas Juvenile Justice Department report of 2011, the total amount of secure facilities registered include "34 post-adjudication, 31 public and 3 privately operated; 49 pre-adjudication facilities, 47 public and 2 privately operated".

Institutions:
 Evins Regional Juvenile Center - unincorporated Hidalgo County
 Gainesville State School - unincorporated Cooke County
 Giddings State School - unincorporated Lee County
 Ron Jackson State Juvenile Correctional Complex (Unit I) - Formerly Brownwood State School - Brownwood
 Serves as the admissions and orientation center for the TJJD inmates. All girls in secure residential care remain at Ron Jackson. In addition boys who are younger are in the Ron Jackson young offenders program. Most male students stay at Ron Jackson for orientation for about four to six weeks.
 A public road separates Units I and the former Ron Jackson Unit II, which operated independently from Unit I under the Texas Youth Commission. The facility is named after former TYC director Ron Jackson.
 Unit I houses the gateway program for females entering the TYC system. Most females in TYC remain at Ron Jackson SJCC I. Some girls may be placed in the WINGS mother-child and pregnant girl program and contract facilities. Unit I has been a female-only complex since it opened in September 1970.
 McLennan County State Juvenile Correctional Facility (Unit I and Unit II) - unincorporated McLennan County, near Mart
 As of 2011 units I and II were combined into one facility. The TYC governing board's original agenda had plans to close both McLennan County units, but the board changed its plans.
 It formerly housed admissions and orientation for male TJJD inmates.

Halfway houses:

 Ayres House - San Antonio
 Brownwood Halfway House - Brownwood
 Cottrell House - Dallas
 McFadden Ranch - Roanoke
 Schaeffer House - El Paso
 Edna Tamayo House - Harlingen
 Willoughby House - Fort Worth
 York House - Corpus Christi

Former facilities:
 Corsicana Residential Treatment Center - Corsicana
 The center was for youth with mental illnesses or severe emotional disturbances - Closed in 2013
 Beto House - McAllen
 Turman Halfway House - Austin

Programs
CoNEXTions
"CoNEXTions is an integrated, system-wide rehabilitative program offering various therapeutic techniques and tools that are used to help individual TJJD youth. The name, CoNEXTions, stems from the basic goal of the program – to prepare youth to take the NEXT step, to connect youth to healthy, law-abiding relationships with their peers, families, and communities".

CoNEXTions was created under the idea that "intense and system-wide implementation of constructive thinking skills while intervening on risky behaviors, in a protective and caring manner, will decrease recidivism and crime among the youth". Areas in the participants lives that are addressed are personal attitudes, values and beliefs, influences and associations with people, alcohol and drug use, personality traits, ability to control behavior, family relationships, academic achievements, vocational achievement, and use of leisure time.
Upon admission to the TJJD unit, the youth are assessed in multiple areas to determine their current physical, mental and emotional status. They are then individually classified according to their offenses and needs and then assigned placement. In CoNEXTions, multiple other TJJD programs are utilized, particularly the Thinking for a Change Program

Educational Programs'
TJJD has year round education for incarcerated youth in each of their institutional schools. The faculty at these schools are TJJD employees
The TJJD Board dictates policy to guide the areas of education provided. The students also participate in all state required assessments as well as the national test, Test of Adult Basic Education (TABE)

Workforce Development Program  
A holistic and integrated approach to help prepare the youth to successfully enter the workforce and maintain employment. Working with state and local businesses, the Workforce Development Program helps prepare and assimilate youth into the working world

PAWS (Pairing Achievement With Success) 
In the PAWS program, TJJD youth are assigned a canine for a minimum of 12 weeks. The TJJD youth and dogs work together to learn important skills from one another; basic commands and socialization for the dogs, and responsibility and friendship skills for the TJJD youth. The TJJD youth are completely responsible at all times for their dog, including feeding, grooming, training, and letting the dog out. At the end of the 12-week program, there is an Adoption Day held where the youth helps show the dog and its new tricks to new owners looking to adopt a pet.

Demographics
As of 2016, of the children under TJJD jurisdiction, including confinement in secure facilities, youth parole, contract facilities, and halfway houses, 3,925 (93.68%) were U.S. citizens and 224 (5.35%) were Mexican citizens. Other countries include Australia, Canada, Colombia, Costa Rica, Cuba, El Salvador, Guatemala, Honduras, Indonesia, Iraq, Korea, Pakistan, Russia, Venezuela, and Vietnam.

Funding
TJJD gets its funding from the Texas Legislature in grant form. TJJD got its funds through the State Financial Assistance Contract that encompasses grants to each of the 165 local juvenile departments. Most of the funding comes from the local county government. The TJJD grants goes toward operating juvenile probation departments, juvenile detention and correctional facilities and providing basic and special services to children in the juvenile probation system. According to the TJJD website, "In fiscal year, 2012 county funding accounted for approximately 72% of total juvenile probation funding while state and federal funding accounted for approximately 28%". In fiscal year, 2014:
Border Project got a contract for $100,000.00. Commitment Reduction Program got a contract for $19,883,584.00. Family Preservation got a contract for $2,243,007.66. Harris County Leadership Academy got a contract for $1,000,000.00. IV-E Contracts got a contract for $1,253,620.54. JJAEP Start-up Operations got a contract for $3,718,896.00. Mental Health got a contract for $12,783,403.29. Special Needs Diversionary got a contract for $1,974,034.00. State Aid got a contract for $108,337,312.00. Total Fiscal Year 2014 Contracts got a contract for $151,586,485.49. Truancy Prevention got a contract for $292,628.00.

Headquarters

The agency is headquartered in the Braker H Complex in Austin, a  private leased space in north Austin. It includes two loading docks, an IT training room, warehouse space, open office landscapes (OOLs), hard-wall offices, 11 conference rooms with capacities ranging from 8 to 110 persons, an employee break room, secure OIO, OIG, and IT areas, and an exterior deck.

The TJJD was previously headquartered in the Brown-Heatly Building in Austin. Brown-Heatley, a seven story, has a six story,  parking garage. DSG Austin provided the facility's fire alarm system.

At the end of April 2013, as part of a building space swap with the Texas Health and Human Services, the TJJD was scheduled to relocate to Braker H. The Braker H facility has more space than the current Brown-Heatley area. The groups moving into the new facility included TJJD central office staff members previously on the second, third, and fifth floors of the Brown-Heatly building, the Office of the Independent Ombudsman, and the TJJD Austin District Parole Office.

See also

References

Further reading
 Harnsberger, R. Scott. A Guide to Sources of Texas Criminal Justice Statistics [North Texas Crime and Criminal Justice Series, no. 6]. Denton: University of North Texas Press, 2011. .

External links
 Texas Juvenile Justice Department
 Ward, Mike. "Two juvenile justice directors in line for new agency job get month off with pay". Austin American-Statesman. Monday December 5, 2012.

State agencies of Texas
Penal system in Texas
Juvenile detention centers in Texas
Texas Juvenile Justice Department
2011 establishments in Texas
Texas
Government agencies established in 2011